This article provides information on candidates standing for the 2009 Queensland state election, which was held on 21 March 2009.

Retiring Members

Labor
 Chris Bombolas MP (Chatsworth)
 Gary Fenlon MP (Greenslopes)
 Ken Hayward MP (Kallangur)
 Linda Lavarch MP (Kurwongbah)
 Jim Pearce MP (Fitzroy)
 Warren Pitt MP (Mulgrave)
 Pat Purcell MP (Bulimba)
 Mike Reynolds MP (Townsville)
 Rod Welford MP (Everton)

LNP
 Kev Lingard MP (Beaudesert) – elected as National

Legislative Assembly
Sitting members are shown in bold text. Successful candidates are highlighted in the relevant colour. Where there is possible confusion, an asterisk (*) is also used.

See also
 Members of the Queensland Legislative Assembly, 2006–2009
 Members of the Queensland Legislative Assembly, 2009–2012
 2009 Queensland state election

References
Antony Green's Guide to the 2009 Queensland state election

Candidates for Queensland state elections